Turbonilla haullevillei is a species of sea snail, a marine gastropod mollusk in the family Pyramidellidae, the pyrams and their allies.

Distribution
This species occurs in the Atlantic Ocean off the estuary of the Congo River.

References

External links
 To World Register of Marine Species

haullevillei
Gastropods described in 1912